Ardmore High School can refer to:
 Ardmore High School, Ardmore City Schools in Ardmore, Oklahoma
 Ardmore High School, Limestone County Schools in Ardmore, Alabama
 The provisional name of Charles Herbert Flowers High School, adjacent to Ardmore census-designated place in Prince George's County, Maryland